This article contains information about the literary events and publications of 1516.

Events

March 1 – Desiderius Erasmus publishes a new Greek translation of the New Testament, Novum Instrumentum omne, in Basel. This year Erasmus also writes The Education of a Christian Prince although it is not published until 1532.
c. December – Thomas More's Utopia, combining fiction and political philosophy and completed this year, is published in Leuven in Latin.
unknown dates
Samuel Nedivot's the 14th century Hebrew Sefer Abudirham in Fez is the first book printed in Africa.
Paolo Ricci translates the 13th century Kabbalistic work Sha'are Orah by Joseph ben Abraham Gikatilla into Latin, as Portae Lucis.

New books

Prose
Heinrich Cornelius Agrippa
 (published in Casale)

Bartolomé de las Casas – Memorial de Remedios para las Indias
Erasmus – Novum Instrumentum omne
Robert Fabyan (anonymous; died c. 1512) – The New Chronicles of England and France (published by Richard Pynson in London)
Marsilio Ficino – 
Thomas More – Utopia
Andre Pauernfeindt –  (Foundation of the knightly art of combat by the fencing guild of Vienna)

Poetry

Ludovico Ariosto – Orlando Furioso (first version, April)
Baptista Mantuanus (published in France)AgellariaDe sacris diebus'' (published in Lyon)

Births
March 26 – Conrad Ges(s)ner, Swiss naturalist, bibliographer and poet (died 1565)
April 23 – Georg Fabricius, Saxon historian, classical archaeologist and epigrapher and poet (died 1571)
December 21 – Giuseppe Leggiadri Gallani, Parmese-born poet and dramatist (died c. 1590)

Deaths
March 22 – Baptista Mantuanus, Mantuan Carmelite reformer, humanist and Latin poet (born 1447)
December 13 – Johannes Trithemius, German lexicographer and chronicler (born 1462)

References

1516

1516 books
Years of the 16th century in literature